SAS or Sas may refer to:

Arts, entertainment, and media 

 SAS (novel series), a French book series by Gérard de Villiers
 Shimmer and Shine, an American animated children's television series
 Southern All Stars, a Japanese rock band
 Strong Arm Steady, an American hip hop group from California
 Sunday All Stars, a Philippine Sunday variety show from 2013 to 2015
 SAS (TV station), a television station in Adelaide, South Australia

Organizations

Military 

 An abbreviation for "Special Air Service" in various armed forces, including:
 Special Air Service, a special forces unit of the British Army
 Special Air Service Regiment, a special forces unit of the Australian Army
 5th Special Air Service, a Belgian Second World War formation
 Canadian Special Air Service Company, a Canadian unit from 1947 to 1949
 Free French Special Air Service, the predecessor unit of the French 1st Marine Infantry Parachute Regiment (1er RPIMa)
 New Zealand Special Air Service, a special forces unit of the New Zealand Army
 Rhodesian Special Air Service, several special forces units from Rhodesia
 Special Air Service, a unit within the Special Forces of Zimbabwe
 South African Ship, the South African Navy warship prefix
 Specialized Administrative Sections, a French civil-military program during the Algerian War
 Su Altı Savunma, a special operations unit of the Turkish Navy

Brands and enterprises 

 SAS (shoemakers), trademark of a shoe company in San Antonio, Texas, US
 SAS (TV station), a television station in Adelaide, South Australia
 SAS Group (Scandinavian Airlines System Group), an airline company based in Stockholm, Sweden; Oslo, Norway; Copenhagen, Denmark
 Scandinavian Airlines, the largest airline in Scandinavia (Denmark, Norway and Sweden)
 SAS Cargo Group, a cargo company in Denmark, Norway and Sweden
 SAS Institute, an analytics software company headquartered in North Carolina, US
 SAS (software), the main software product of the company
 SAS language, the language used to program the software
 Société par actions simplifiée, French designation of a joint stock type of company
 Southern Audio Services, an electronics manufacturer based in Baton Rouge, Louisiana, US

Healthcare 

 Andalusian Health Service (Servicio Andaluz de Salud), the government-run health system of Andalusia, Spain
 Scottish Ambulance Service

Schools

Asia 

 St. Augustine's School, Kalimpong, a school in Kalimpong, West Bengal, India
 Sekolah Sultan Alam Shah, a boarding school in Malaysia
 Shanghai American School, an international school in Shanghai
 Singapore American School, an international school in Singapore

Europe 

 Sankt-Ansgar-Schule, Hamburg, Germany
 School of Advanced Study, a postgraduate institution of the University of London, United Kingdom
 Studia Academica Slovaca, a summer school teaching the Slovak language

North America 

 Saline Area Schools, a school district in Michigan
 Saint Andrew's School (Boca Raton, Florida)
 Saint Andrew's School (Savannah, Georgia)
 Saint Andrew's School (Saratoga, California)
 School for Advanced Studies, a high school program in Miami, Florida, United States
 Semester at Sea, a shipboard academic program administered by the University of Virginia, United States

Other organizations 

 Second Amendment Sisters, a women's advocacy group focusing on gun rights in the United States of America
 Sense about Science, a UK-based organization promoting respect for good science
 Servants Anonymous Society, a nonprofit women's organization
 Sloboda a Solidarita or Freedom and Solidarity, a political party in Slovakia
 Slovak Academy of Sciences, the main scientific and research institution in Slovakia
 Society for Affective Science, a non-profit organization devoted to the science of affect
 Society for Amateur Scientists, an American non-profit organization
 Society for Animation Studies, an international scholarly organization
 Space Access Society, an organization dedicated to increasing the viability and reducing the cost of commercial access to space travel
 Strong American Schools, an American non-profit organization that promotes sound education policies
 Surfers Against Sewage, a UK-based campaign for clean, safe recreational water
 Sussex Archaeological Society, an archaeological society based in Lewes, Sussex, UK

People 

 Sas of Moldavia (died 1358), voivode ruling over what was to become Moldavia between 1354 and 1358
 Éva Sas, French politician
 Ferenc Sas, Hungarian footballer
 Hasan Şaş, Turkish footballer
 Julian Sas, Dutch blues rock guitarist, singer and songwriter
 Stephen A. Smith, American sports analyst

Places 

 Šas, a village in Montenegro
 Sas, Iran, a village in Mazandaran Province, Iran
 Sas, a tributary of the river Bouleț in Romania
 Sas van Gent, a town in the Netherlands

Science, technology, and mathematics

Biology and medicine 

 Sleep apnea syndrome, a sleep disorder in which pauses in breathing or periods of shallow breathing during sleep occur more often than normal
 Solvent-accessible surface, the surface area of a biomolecule that is accessible to a solvent
 Subarachnoid space, the space between the arachnoid mater and pia mater in the brain
 Subvalvular aortic stenosis (non-human), an abnormal, congenital heart murmur
 Syndesmotic ankle sprain, a type of ankle sprain

Computing 

 SAS (software), (Statistical Analysis System) an integrated software suite produced by SAS Institute Inc.
 SAS language, a data processing and statistical analysis language
 Secure Attention Sequence, a special key combination which invokes a trusted login process (e.g. Ctrl+Alt+Delete on Windows NT systems)
 Serial Attached SCSI, a computer bus technology for the transfer of data to and from storage devices (e.g., hard disks)
 Shared access signature, a security token which can be attached to a URL
 Short Authentication String, a method used in the ZRTP cryptographic protocol
 Slot Accounting System protocol, a slot machine communication method created by the International Game Technology (IGT) corporation
 Sorcerer's Apprentice Syndrome, a network protocol flaw in the Trivial File Transfer Protocol (TFTP)
 Spatially Aware Sublayer, an optional sublayer of the MAC that provides spatial reuse in Resilient Packet Ring

Space 

 Small Astronomy Satellite (disambiguation), one of three of NASA-operated space telescopes
 Space Access Society, an organization dedicated to increasing the viability and reducing the cost of commercial access to space travel
 Space activity suit, a spacesuit which provides mechanical pressure by means of elastic garments
 Space adaptation syndrome, an illness akin to motion sickness experienced by many first-time space travellers
 Sistema Avariynogo Spaseniya, (Russian: CAC, Система Аварийного Спасения), the Soyuz launch escape system

Other uses in science, technology, and mathematics 

 Self-anchored suspension bridge, a suspension bridge in which the main cables attach to the ends of the deck
 Side-angle-side, a concept in geometry for determining congruence or similarity of triangles
 Small-angle scattering, a scattering technique based on the deflection of a beam of particles away from the straight trajectory after it interacts with a sample
 Solid Axle Suspension, a type of automobile suspension
 Stability Augmentation System, a limited form of autopilot that stabilizes an aircraft in one or more axes
 Synthetic aperture sonar, a form of sonar analogous to synthetic aperture radar
 Supercritical Anti-Solvent, a method used for micronization of substances

Sport 

 San Antonio Spurs, a professional basketball team in San Antonio, Texas, United States
 SAS Championship, a golf tournament in Cary, North Carolina, United States
 SAS Masters Tour, a domestic professional golf tour operated by the Swedish Golf Association
 Stars Association for Sports, a women's association football club in Aley, Lebanon

Transportation 

 Salton Sea Airport, IATA airport code SAS
 Sam Shing stop, MTR station code SAS
 San Antonio station (Texas), Amtrak code SAS
 Second Avenue Subway, a subway line in New York City

Other uses 

 Sas coat of arms, a European coat of arms (German, Hungarian, Lithuanian, Polish, Romanian and Ukrainian)
 Statements on auditing standards, a series of internationally recognized auditing standards

See also 

 History of the SAS (disambiguation)
 Saas (disambiguation)
 Sass (disambiguation)